Two-ball (or twoball, 2-ball, 2 ball and other variant spellings) may refer to:

 2 ball, the pool ball (pocket billiards) numbered "2" and colored blue
 2 ball, the yellow snooker ball, worth two points, normally referred to as "the yellow"
 2-ball, a two-dimensional -ball in mathematics, represented by a circle (disc)

See also
 Ball two, the second non-strike thrown to a batter in baseball or softball—see count (baseball)